Laelius pedatus is a hymenopteran parasitoid in the family Bethylidae. It is a gregarious idiobiont larval ectoparasitoid. It is used as a biological control agent against beetle pests in the family Dermestidae.

Known hosts are: 
 Anthrenus flavipes LeConte
 Anthrenus sarnicus Mroczkowski
 Anthrenus verbasci L.
 Trogoderma angustum Solier
 Trogoderma glabrum Herbst
 Trogoderma granarium Everts

References

Chrysidoidea